Edward "Ted" Long (born January 26, 1955) is a Canadian former professional ice hockey player who played in the World Hockey Association (WHA). Drafted in the fifth round of the 1975 NHL Amateur Draft by the Toronto Maple Leafs, Long opted to play in the WHA after being selected by the Winnipeg Jets in the fourth round of the 1975 WHA Amateur Draft. He played in one game for the Cincinnati Stingers during the 1976–77 WHA season.

Awards
1975–76 OMJHL Third All-Star Team
Named to all-time Hamilton (OMJHL/OHL) team

References

External links

1955 births
Canadian ice hockey defencemen
Canadian ice hockey left wingers
Cincinnati Stingers players
Hamilton Fincups players
Hamilton Red Wings (OHA) players
Hampton Gulls (SHL) players
Ice hockey people from Ontario
Living people
Niagara Falls Flyers players
People from Woodstock, Ontario
Springfield Indians players
Toronto Maple Leafs draft picks
Winnipeg Jets (WHA) draft picks